The European Union Act (or European Union Bill) can refer to several pieces of legislation.

Acts in the United Kingdom 
European Communities Act 1972 (UK)
European Union (Accessions) Act 1994
European Union (Accessions) Act 2003
European Union (Accessions) Act 2006
European Union (Amendment) Act 2008
European Union Act 2011
European Union (Approval of Treaty Amendment Decision) Act 2012
European Union (Croatian Accession and Irish Protocol) Act 2013
European Union (Approvals) Act 2013
European Union (Finance) Act 2015
European Union Referendum Act 2015
European Union (Notification of Withdrawal) Act 2017
European Union (Withdrawal) Act 2018
European Union (Withdrawal) Act 2019
European Union (Withdrawal) (No. 2) Act 2019
European Union (Withdrawal Agreement) Act 2020
European Union (Future Relationship) Act 2020

Scottish Parliament
UK Withdrawal from the European Union (Continuity) (Scotland) Act 2020

Bills in the United Kingdom 
European Union Bill 2004–05
European Union (Referendum) Bill 2013–14

Scottish Parliament
UK Withdrawal from the European Union (Legal Continuity) (Scotland) Bill 2018

Acts in Gibraltar 
European Union (Referendum) Act 2016 (Gibraltar)

See also 
 European Communities Act (disambiguation)